Richard Paul McGehee (born 20 September 1943, in San Diego) is an American mathematician, who works on dynamical systems with special emphasis on celestial mechanics.

McGehee received from Caltech in 1964 his bachelor's degree and from University of Wisconsin–Madison in 1965 his master's degree and in 1969 his Ph.D. under Charles C. Conley with thesis Homoclinic orbits in the restricted three body problem. As a postdoc he was at the Courant Institute of Mathematical Sciences of New York University. In 1970 he became an assistant professor and in 1979 a full professor at the University of Minnesota in Minneapolis, where he was from 1994 to 1998 the director of the Center for the Computation and Visualization of Geometric Structures.

In the 1970s he introduced a coordinate transformation (now known as the McGehee transformation) which he used to regularize singularities arising in the Newtonian three-body problem. In 1975 he, with John N. Mather, proved that for the Newtonian collinear four-body problem there exist solutions which become unbounded in a finite time interval.

In 1978 he was an Invited Speaker on the subject of Singularities in classical celestial mechanics at the International Congress of Mathematicians in Helsinki.

See also
McGehee transformation

Selected publications

with Robert A. Armstrong: 
 

as editor with Kenneth R. Meyer:

References

External links
Richard McGehee's Publication List, umn.edu

20th-century American mathematicians
21st-century American mathematicians
California Institute of Technology alumni
Courant Institute of Mathematical Sciences alumni
University of Wisconsin–Madison alumni
University of Minnesota faculty
1943 births
Living people